Roger Blonder is an independent animator and educator born in 1967 in Los Angeles, California.

Blonder received his MFA from the UCLA School of Theater, Film and Television. He has taught animation at Art Center College of Design in Pasadena, CA, Loyola Marymount University and in the UCLA Animation Workshop. He is currently teaching and developing a program in Jewish Media Arts at the Toledo High School in West Hills, California.

At the intersection of media arts and Jewish life, Blonder has served as the Visual Artist in Residence for the Brandeis Collegiate Institute (BCI) program of the Brandeis-Bardin Institute, developed an interactive archaeology installation for the Hebrew Union College Skirball Cultural Center, and participated as a researcher in the development of the Interactive Multimedia Research Center of the Simon Wiesenthal Center Museum of Tolerance.

Films and awards

The Common Sense of the Wisdom Tree – short animated film 1998
 California Sun International Animation Festival May 1998 – AWARD: Best Experimental Animated Film
 Message to Man Documentary, Short and Animated Film Festival, Saint Petersburg, Russia, July 1998
 Wine Country Film Festival, Napa, California, July 1998
 Palm Springs International Short Film Festival, July/August 1998
 Crested Butte Reel Fest, Crested Butte, Colorado – August 1998
 Rhode Island International Film Festival – August 1998 – AWARD: Best of the Fest – Animation
 Hermosa Beach Film Festival – August 1998
 Temecula Valley International Film Festival – September 1998
 Breckenridge Festival of Film, Breckenridge, Colorado – September 1998
 Vermont International Film Festival – October 1998
 Nature and Environment Film Festival, Grenoble, France – November 1998
 Worldfest Flagstaff, Flagstaff, Arizona – AWARD: Gold Award for Best Independent Animated Short Film
 Mendrisio Animation Festival, Switzerland – November 1998
 Cinemagic International Festival for Young People, Ireland – December 1998
 USA KidFilm Festival, in Dallas, Texas, January 1999
 Environmental Film Festival, Smithsonean, Washington D.C. – March 1999
 Green Extreme Film Festival, Saltspring Island, BC – April 1999
 National Educational Media Awards- May 1999 -AWARD: Bronze Apple
 Nashville Film Festival – June 1999
 Chicago International Children's Film Festiva – October 1999 – AWARD: Audience Favorite – Whole Foods Green Screen Prize
 Cornell Environmental Film Festival, Ithaca, NY October 1999
 EcoFilm Festival, Lille, France – October 1999
 Mumbai International Film Festival – MIFF 2000, Bombay, India – Jan 2000
 Ale Kino – The 18th Int’l Festival of Films for Children, Poznan, Poland May 2000
 DiverCine 2000 – Montevideo, Uruguay; Rosario, Argentina; Santa Fe, Argentina; La Paz, Bolivia; Porto Alegre, Brazil; Valdivia, Chile; Bogota, Colombia; Guadalajara, Mexico; Lima, Peru; Caracas, Venezuela – August 2000
 Carrousel International Du Film De Rimouski, Rimouski, Quebec, September 2000 – HUMANITAS CAMÉRIO nomination
 Humboldt International Short Film Festival, 2003 – retrospective

poeTreeMan, interactive project, 1995
September 1994 – June 1995
a CD-ROM interactive exploration of poetry, illustrations, and short animated films. Finalist in the New Media Magazine InVision Awards and the International Digital Media Awards.

TreeMan, short animated film, 1994
 Student Academy Awards Regional Finalist
 Humboldt International Short Film Festival, 2003 – retrospective

Sow N' Till, short animated film, 1994
 UCLA Festival 94
 Humboldt International Short Film Festival, 2003 – retrospective

Train of Thought, short animated film, 1992
 Zagreb Animation Festival, Croatia June 1994
 Academy of Arts and Sciences, Samuel Goldwyn Theater, June 1993– AWARD: Spotlight Award UCLA Alumni Association
 Big Muddy Film Festival, Carbondale, Illinois, May 1993;
 Charlotte Film and Video Festival, North Carolina, 1993;
 Immaculate Projections: Artists and Spirituality, Los Angeles 5/93
 Laemmle Sunset Theater April, 1993
 DreamWorks 1996 Employee Short Film Festival
 Cine-Poetry Festival, San Francisco 1996 – AWARD: Patchen Award for Best Animated Film
 Humboldt International Short Film Festival, 2003 – retrospective

Stress Dream, short animated film, 1990

External links
 Personal portfolio site
 Wisdom Tree Media

American animated film directors
1967 births
Animators from California
Artists from Los Angeles
Living people
Animation educators